Walter W. Hackett (c. 1923 – April 24, 1971) was an American football coach. He served as the defensive line coach for the San Diego Chargers of the American Football League (AFL) from 1962 to 1966 and the Pittsburgh Steelers of the National Football League (NFL) from 1969 to 1970. Hackett was the head football coach at the University of California, San Diego during that school's lone season with a football program, in 1968.

Hackett attended Ramona High School in Ramona, San Diego County, California, where he played high school football.  He played four years of college football at Whittier College in Whittier, California under head coach Wallace Newman.  Hackett died at the age of 47, on April 24, 1971, in Long Beach, California, after collapsing as he prepared to scout the Long Beach State football team.

Head coaching record

References

Year of birth missing
1920s births
1971 deaths
American football tackles
Baylor Bears football coaches
Pittsburgh Steelers coaches
San Diego Chargers coaches
UC San Diego Tritons football coaches
Whittier Poets football players
High school football coaches in California
Junior college football coaches in the United States
People from Tuscola, Illinois
People from Ramona, San Diego County, California
Sportspeople from San Diego County, California
Players of American football from California